The 2016 United States presidential election in Ohio was held on Tuesday, November 8, 2016, as part of the 2016 United States presidential election in which all 50 states plus the District of Columbia participated. Ohio voters chose electors to represent them in the Electoral College via a popular vote, pitting the Republican Party's nominee, businessman Donald Trump, and running mate Indiana Governor Mike Pence against Democratic Party nominee, former Secretary of State Hillary Clinton, and her running mate Virginia Senator Tim Kaine. Ohio had 18 electoral votes in the Electoral College.

Ohio was won by Trump by a margin of 8.07 points. Prior to the election, most news organizations considered the Buckeye State as leaning Republican, due to Trump's appeal to blue-collar voters in the Rust Belt. Ohio kept its streak of voting for the winner (a bellwether state) since 1964, as it voted for Trump, who won nationally. Having previously voted Democratic in 2012 and 2008, the win margin was the second largest of the states Trump flipped red, after Iowa. It also marked the largest margin of victory since George H. W. Bush defeated Michael Dukakis in the state in 1988. Additionally, Trump became the first Republican to win the presidency without carrying Hamilton County since Rutherford B. Hayes in 1876. Ohio was 11.1 points more Republican in this election than it was in 2012. Trump won 80 of Ohio's 88 counties, the most since Ronald Reagan won 82 in 1984.

Ohio was 10.2% more Republican than the national average in 2016, the farthest it had voted from the rest of the nation since 1932. The state had also been one of eleven to vote for Bill Clinton twice in 1992 and 1996, only to be lost by Hillary Clinton in 2016.

This election would mark the end of Ohio's bellwether streak, having voted for the winning candidate in every election from 1964 to 2016, the longest bellwether streak of any state in the nation's history.

Primary elections

Republican primary

Results

Democratic primary

The Democratic Party's presidential primaries in Ohio were held on March 15, 2016, concurrently with primaries in Florida, Illinois, Missouri and North Carolina. The state's 143 pledged delegates to the 2016 Democratic National Convention were rewarded proportionally according to the statewide vote total. Three candidates appeared on the ballot for the primary – former Secretary of State Hillary Clinton, Senator Bernie Sanders and businessman Rocky De La Fuente.

Background
By the time Ohio held its primaries, voters from 21 states and two territories already cast their vote for the presidential nomination of the Democratic Party. As of the March 12 elections, Hillary Clinton was projected to have earned 775 pledged delegates to Bernie Sanders' 552. Clinton gained significant victories in the Southern United States, often described as her "firewall", including landslide victories in Mississippi and Alabama and Georgia. In contrast, Bernie Sanders managed to gain victories in the Midwestern United States, where Ohio resides, including an upset victory in neighboring Michigan on March 8. After the fact, Sanders' campaign took advantage of the momentum gained from the Michigan win, by targeting Illinois, Missouri and Ohio in the March 15 elections, hoping to repeat the same result. Sanders stated that "Not only is Michigan the gateway to the rest of the industrial Midwest, the results there show that we are a national campaign."

Before the Michigan primaries, Clinton and Sanders had debated over economic policies relating to the industrial Midwest states and the so-called "rust belt". The disagreements centered around trade deals, including the Trans-Pacific Partnership and Clinton's past support of the North American Free Trade Agreement, and its effect on economies such as Michigan and Ohio.

Controversy
Ohio is one of at least seventeen states that has laws allowing voters who are 17 years of age, but will be 18 by the time of the general election, to vote in the presidential primaries. However, Ohio Secretary of State Jon A. Husted had announced in December 2015 that 17 year olds would be outright barred from participating in the 2016 primaries. The rationale for the decision was based on an interpretation of the law in which 17 year olds could "nominate" officials for office, but not "elect". In the case of the presidential primaries, by definition, voters would be electing officials – delegates to each party's presidential nominating convention. The decision was met with criticism by the public, after it was brought to mainstream attention by Representative Kathleen Clyde, after she condemned the rule in a statement released on March 5. Clyde described it as a "underhanded, backroom attack" against young voters. Nine teenagers filed a lawsuit with the Ohio Courts of Common Pleas in Franklin County over the decision, stating that the decision contradicted state law and a decision by the Supreme Court of the United States that allowed 17 year olds turning 18 by the general election to vote.

Bernie Sanders' campaign, whose voter base includes the majority of young voters, also filed a lawsuit against the decision, accusing Husted of "arbitrarily" and "unconsititutionally" discriminating against young African-American and Latino voters, citing data from the 2010 United States Census that shows younger voters in Ohio were mostly African-American and Latino. Husted, in response to Sanders' lawsuit, said in a public statement that he welcomed the lawsuit, further stating that "I am very happy to be sued on this issue because the law is crystal clear", though, he later spoke out negatively against the lawsuit, claiming that it was "a last-minute political act", designed to "draw attention to his campaign." Many Ohio officials, past and present, such as former Ohio Secretary of State Jennifer Brunner, came out in support of Sanders' lawsuit, and had attracted protests by not only Bernie Sanders supporters, but also Donald Trump supporters as well. In a decision handed down on March 11, an Ohio state judge ruled in favor of both lawsuits by the teenage group and the Sanders campaign, effectively lifting the ban on 17 year olds from voting in the Ohio presidential primaries. Husted initially announced that he would appeal the ruling, however, after learning that such an appeal would not be heard by the court until the day before the primaries, he retracted his intent to appeal.

Forums
March 13, 2016 – Columbus, Ohio

The ninth forum was held at 8:00 pm EDT on March 13, 2016, at the campus of Ohio State University in Columbus, Ohio, and aired on CNN.

March 14, 2016 – Columbus, Ohio and Springfield, Illinois

The tenth forum was held at 6:00 pm EDT on March 14, 2016, at the campus of Ohio State University in Columbus, Ohio, and at the Old State Capitol State Historic Site (Illinois) in Springfield, Illinois. It aired on MSNBC. The first section of the town hall with Bernie Sanders was moderated by Chuck Todd; the second section of the town hall with Hillary Clinton was moderated by Chris Matthews.

Results

Green state convention
The Green Party of Ohio participated in the March 15 primaries in Ohio, though they did not hold their presidential primary during the event. Instead, delegates to the Green National Convention were awarded based on presidential preference through a nominating convention in Columbus on April 3. Members of the Green Party of Ohio were able to vote in the convention.

Polling

Until September 2016, Hillary Clinton won or tied in the vast majority of polls, with Trump only winning 2 polls before September. However, on September 7, Trump won his first statewide poll in 4 months by 46% to 45%. Subsequently, in September, Republican nominee Donald Trump took a lead in Ohio polls, winning every poll but one. In the beginning of October, Clinton regained a narrow lead, but after October 12, every poll except one ended with Trump winning or a tie. The average of the final three polls showed Trump leading 46% to 44%. The final poll showed Trump ahead 46% to 39%, which was accurate compared to the results.

Republican National Convention
From July 17 through the 20th, Cleveland hosted the Republican Convention, which nominated Donald Trump and Mike Pence.

General election

Predictions
The following are final 2016 predictions from various organizations for Ohio as of Election Day.

Results

Official state results from the Ohio Secretary of State are as follows

By county

Counties that flipped from Democratic to Republican

Ashtabula (largest city: Ashtabula)
Erie (largest city: Sandusky)
Montgomery (largest city: Dayton)
Ottawa (largest city: Port Clinton)
Portage (largest city: Kent)
Sandusky (largest city: Fremont)
Stark (largest city: Canton)
Trumbull (largest city: Warren)
Wood (largest city: Bowling Green)

By congressional district
Trump won 12 of 16 congressional districts.

See also
 United States presidential elections in Ohio
 Presidency of Donald Trump
 2016 Democratic Party presidential debates and forums
 2016 Democratic Party presidential primaries
 2016 Republican Party presidential debates and forums
 2016 Republican Party presidential primaries

References

Further reading

External links
 RNC 2016 Republican Nominating Process 
 Green papers for 2016 primaries, caucuses, and conventions
 Decision Desk Headquarter Results for Ohio
 Primary Election Results , Ohio Secretary of State

Presidential
OH
2016